La Dona Catalana ("Catalan Woman") was a Catalan language home and fashion magazine. It was published by Editorial Bosch in Barcelona between 1925 and 1938. Starting on 9 October 1925, the weekly periodical came out every Friday, although there was some sporadic irregularity. It was founded by a pioneer of Catalan cinema, Magi Murià (Barcelona, 1881 - Mexico, 1954). He came from a working-class family whose social status was modest, but he learned French, film and journalism on his own. His daughter, the writer Anna Murià, wrote her first article for the magazine using the pseudonym "Roser Català"; even her father did not know who was the author of that article. A total of 681 issues were published. La Dona Catalana's last issue occurred on 16 December 1938, when Franco's troops began the Catalonia Offensive.

References

 VVAA, “Pequeña Memoria Recobrada. Libros Infantiles del Exilio del 1939”; Madrid. Ed. Ministerio de Educación, Política Social y Deporte, Subdirección General de Información y Publicaciones; 2008. (in Spanish)
 ELI BARTRA i LLORENÇ ESTEVE, “La I Guerra Mundial y el Auge del Cine Catalán: Un Estudio de “Barcinógrafo” y de Magí Murià”; Film Historia, nº 4: p. 186-196; 1994. (in Spanish)
 EULÀLIA PÉREZ I VALLVERDÚ; La Literatura Infantil i Juvenil de Josep Maria Folch i Torres; Ed. L’Abadia de Montserrat; 2012. (in Catalan)
 JOAQUÍM ROMAGUERA; “Memòries d’um exiliat, 1939-1948”; Col·lecció Guimet; 2002. (in Catalan)
 NÚRIA PI I VENDRELL; “Bibliografia de la novel·la sentimental publicada em Català, entre 1924 i 1938”; Diputació de Barcelona; 1986. (in Catalan)

1925 establishments in Spain
1938 disestablishments in Spain
Magazines published in Catalonia
Catalan-language magazines
Defunct magazines published in Spain
Lifestyle magazines
Magazines established in 1925
Magazines disestablished in 1938
Magazines published in Barcelona
Women's fashion magazines
Weekly magazines published in Spain
Women's magazines published in Spain